Air Vice Marshal Cecil Howard Beamish CB FDSRCS (31 March 1915 – 21 May 1999) was an Irish RAF officer, who served during the Second World War and was later Director of RAF Dental Services 1969–1973.  He was the youngest of the Beamish brothers, the others being Victor, George and Charles, all RAF officers and accomplished sportsmen. Beamish played rugby for London Irish, the Barbarians and the RAF. He was an accomplished amateur golfer, who represented Ireland internationally; he was runner-up in the Irish Amateur Open Championship in 1952 and a semi-finalist in The Amateur Championship in 1953.

References 

1915 births
1999 deaths
Irish rugby union players
Barbarian F.C. players
Leicester Tigers players
Irish male golfers
Amateur golfers
Royal Air Force personnel of World War II